Verkhovyna (before 1962) is an urban-type settlement located in Ivano-Frankivsk Oblast in western Ukraine. Verkhovyna serves as the administrative center of Verkhovyna Raion. It hosts the administration of Verkhovyna settlement hromada, one of the hromadas of Ukraine. Population: .

It was originally established as Żabie in 1424.

The town is located in the Hutsul region of the Carpathian Mountains called Pokuttya, upon the Cheremosh River, a tributary of the Prut. Verkhovyna is currently an important tourist center in Ukraine.  The town's name means "highland place."

In 1919–1939, Żabie belonged to Poland and was located in the Kosów Powiat (county) of the Stanisławów Voivodeship. During those years, it was one of the main tourist centers of the country, attracting people from as far away as England. It was also the biggest rural community in Poland (in terms of territory).

There is an Orthodox church, a Hutsul museum and a Polish cemetery with monuments of soldiers of the Polish Border Patrol who died while protecting the pre-1939 border. Another important attraction in Verkhovyna is the Museum of Musical Instruments and Hutsuls Lifestyle founded by Roman Kumlyk.

Gallery

Climate
The climate in Verkhovyna is a mild to warm summer subtype (Köppen: Dfb) of the humid continental climate.

References

Urban-type settlements in Verkhovyna Raion
Verkhovyna Raion